Overstreet is an English surname. Notable people with the surname include:

Baker Overstreet (born 1981), American artist
Chord Overstreet (born 1989), American actor, singer, musician and composer 
David Overstreet (1958–1984), American football player
Harold G. Overstreet (born 1944), United States Marine Corps officer
Harry Allen Overstreet (1875–1970), American writer and lecturer
James Overstreet (1773–1822), American politician
James W. Overstreet (1866–1938), American politician
Jason Overstreet, American politician
Jeffrey Overstreet, American novelist and film reviewer 
Jesse Overstreet (1859–1910), American politician
Morris Overstreet (born 1950), American judge
Paul Overstreet (born 1955), American singer-songwriter
Tommy Overstreet (1937–2015), American singer
Will Overstreet (born 1979), American football player
William Benton Overstreet (1888–1935), American songwriter, bandleader and pianist

See also
Lake Overstreet, a lake in Leon County, Florida, United States
Overstreet Comic Book Price Guide, a comic book price guide

English-language surnames